Marc McClure (born March 31, 1957) is an American actor known for playing Jimmy Olsen in the Superman series of feature films released between 1978 and 1987 and Dave McFly in the Back to the Future films.

Career
McClure appeared in the 1976 film Freaky Friday. In 2003 he had a small cameo in the remake.

He was in the 1977 Brigham Young University church video The Phone Call as Scott, who works at Ripples Drive-In. In 1978 he appeared in the film I Wanna Hold Your Hand and in 1980 appeared in the film Used Cars, both of which were written by Robert Zemeckis and Bob Gale.

McClure's best known role is as Jimmy Olsen in the 1978 film Superman, and its sequels, Superman II, Superman III, Superman IV: The Quest for Peace, and in the 1984 spinoff film Supergirl. He is the only actor to appear in the same role in all four Christopher Reeve-era Superman films and Supergirl. McClure also played Jimmy Olsen in a 1985 commercial for the Kenner Super Powers Collection action figure line.

McClure played Dave McFly, Marty McFly's older brother in the 1985 film Back to the Future, reuniting him with his I Wanna Hold Your Hand co-star Wendie Jo Sperber, and with writers Bob Gale and Robert Zemeckis, who wrote and directed that film, respectively. McClure reprised the role of Dave McFly in the sequels, Back to the Future Part II (though his only scene was not included in the theatrical version) and Back to the Future Part III.

He has made appearances in many television series, including Once an Eagle, Happy Days, Hunter, The Shield and Cold Case.

In a nod to his Superman feature film work, McClure appeared in "Persona", a seventh-season episode of the CW's Smallville, portraying Dax-Ur, a Kryptonian scientist who has been living on Earth for over 100 years. He also appeared in a cameo role as a prison security officer in the film Justice League in 2017. He also appears in the 2021 director's cut Zack Snyder's Justice League, as a police officer who befriends Lois Lane and is later saved by Cyborg during the teams battle with an amnesiac Superman.

Filmography

References

External links
 
 Marc McClure Interview, February 2005

1957 births
American male film actors
American male television actors
Living people
Male actors from the San Francisco Bay Area